Joseph Rucker may refer to:

 Joseph Rucker (1788–?), American landholder and slaver, owner of the Rucker House (Ruckersville, Georgia)
 Joseph T. Rucker (1887–1957), American cinematographer